Reggie Holmes (born September 13, 1945) was a Canadian football player who played for the Calgary Stampeders. He won the Grey Cup with Calgary in 1971. He is best remembered as the player who recovered the infamous late game fumble by Toronto Argonauts halfback, Leon McQuay to secure the Grey cup victory for Calgary. Holmes later played one season for the Detroit Wheels of the World Football League. He played college football at University of Wisconsin-Stout.

References

1945 births
Living people
People from Macon, Mississippi
Wisconsin–Stout Blue Devils football players
Players of American football from Mississippi
Calgary Stampeders players
Detroit Wheels players
American players of Canadian football
American football defensive backs
Canadian football defensive backs